Uzbekistan competed in the 2010 Youth Summer Olympics in Singapore.

Medalists

Nurbek Hakkulov was disqualified after testing positive for a banned substance. He was stripped of his silver medal.

Athletics

Boys
Field Events

Girls
Field Events

Boxing

Boys

Gymnastics

Artistic Gymnastics

Boys

Girls

Rhythmic Gymnastics 

Individual

Judo

Individual

Team

Shooting

Pistol

Swimming

Taekwondo

Table Tennis 

Individual

Team

Weightlifting

Wrestling

Freestyle

Greco-Roman

References

External links

Competitors List: Uzbekistan

2010 in Uzbekistani sport
Nations at the 2010 Summer Youth Olympics
Uzbekistan at the Youth Olympics